Eric Alan Donaldson (27 August 1899 – 20 July 1986) was an Australian rules footballer who played with Melbourne in the Victorian Football League (VFL).

Notes

External links 

1899 births
Australian rules footballers from Victoria (Australia)
Melbourne Football Club players
1986 deaths